Priscilla Hon was the defending champion, but lost to Maddison Inglis in the semifinals.

Lizette Cabrera won the title, defeating Inglis in an all-Australian final, 6–2, 6–3.

Seeds

Draw

Finals

Top half

Bottom half

References

External Links
Main Draw

Bendigo Women's International - Singles